Events from the year 1938 in art.

Events
 January 2 –  sinks off St Ives, Cornwall; the wreck is painted by local ex-fisherman naïve artist Alfred Wallis in several versions, one of which will subsequently be displayed in Tate St Ives, metres from the wreck.
 January 16 – International Exposition of Surrealism opens at the Galerie des Beaux-Arts in Paris.
 January 24 – Peggy Guggenheim opens her Guggenheim Jeune gallery at 30 Cork Street in London with a display of work by Jean Cocteau, followed in February by the first showing of Wassily Kandinsky's work in Britain.
 July 8 – Exhibition of twentieth century German art opens in London at the New Burlington Galleries, challenging the Nazi view of "degenerate art" in its home country.
 July 10 – Second Große Deutsche Kunstausstellung ("Great German Art Exhibition") opened by Adolf Hitler in the Haus der deutschen Kunst ("House of German Art") in Munich; Hitler attacks the contemporary London exhibition.
 July 13 – Kröller-Müller Museum, designed by Henry van de Velde, opens in Otterlo, Netherlands.
 September – Piet Mondrian moves from Paris to London.
 December 5–17 – Albert Namatjira exhibition in Melbourne includes over 2,000 works, the first solo display of indigenous Australian art.
 American art collector Louis J. Caldor 'discovers' the naïve paintings of Grandma Moses.

Awards
 Archibald Prize: Nora Heysen – Mme Elink Schuurman

Works

 Vilmos Aba-Novák – Fair in Transylvania
 Rita Angus – Head of a Maori Boy
 Thomas Hart Benton – Haystack
 Constantin Brâncuși – The Endless Column (sculpture)
 Javier Bueno – The Fighter of Madrid
 Marc Chagall – White Crucifixion
 William Coldstream – Bolton
 Salvador Dalí
 Apparition of Face and Fruit Dish on a Beach
 Impressions of Africa
 Rainy Taxi
 Charles Despiau – Assia (sculpture, Museum of Modern Art, New York)
 Arthur Dove – Swing Music
 M. C. Escher – Sky and Water II (lithograph)
 Leonor Fini
 Composition with Figures on a Terrace
 D'Un jour à l'autre (From One Day to Another, diptych)
 Edward Hopper – Compartment C, Car 293
 Kurt Hutton – Funfair, Southend, Essex (photograph)
 Frida Kahlo
 Four Inhabitants of Mexico City
 Self-Portrait with Monkey
 The Suicide of Dorothy Hale
 What the Water Gave Me
 Ernst Ludwig Kirchner – Violet House in Front of a Snowy Mountain
 Paul Klee - Oriental Bliss
 L. S. Lowry – Family Group
 René Magritte – Time Transfixed
 Aristide Maillol – Air
 Ronald Moody – Tacet (carved wood head)
 Paul Nash
 Landscape from a Dream
 Nocturnal Landscape
 John Petts – Fishwife of Ynys Mon
 Pablo Picasso
 Femme au beret rouge-orange
 Maya with Doll
 Walter Sickert – Sir Thomas Beecham Conducting
 Steffen Thomas – Pioneer Women
 Rex Whistler – Capriccio (dining room mural at Plas Newydd in North Wales)
 Ignacio Zuloaga – The Alcázar in Flames (Heroic Landscape of Toledo)

Births
 January 2
 David Bailey, English photographer
 Robert Smithson, American artist (d. 1973)
 January 7 – Roland Topor, French illustrator, painter, writer and filmmaker (d. 1997)
 February 13 – Joan Brown, American figurative painter (d. 1990)
 February 22 – Paul Neagu, Romanian-born artist (d. 2004)
 March 6 – Pauline Boty, English pop art painter (d. 1966)
 March 15 – Dick Higgins, English composer, poet, printer and early Fluxus artist (d. 1998)
 April 20 – Andrew Vicari, Welsh-born portrait painter (d. 2016)
 May 12 – Paul Huxley, English painter and academic
 May 18 – Janet Fish, American Realist painter
 May 20 – Astrid Kirchherr, German photographer (d. 2020)
 July 24 – Eugene J. Martin, American visual artist (d. 2005)
 July 28 – Robert Hughes, Australian-born art critic (d. 2012)
 July 30 – Terry O'Neill, British photographer (d. 2019)
 August 19 – Robert Graham, Mexican-American sculptor (d. 2008)
 August 29 – Hermann Nitsch, Austrian performance artist
 September 1 – Per Kirkeby, Danish artist (d. 2018)
 September 25 – Bill Owens, American photographer
 September 27 – Günter Brus, Austrian performance artist
 October 10 – Daidō Moriyama, Japanese photographer
 October 15 – Brice Marden, American painter
 October 20 – Iain Macmillan, Scottish photographer (d. 2006)
 November 2 – Richard Serra, American artist and sculptor
 November 10 – Claude Serre, French cartoonist (d. 1998)
 December 25 – Duane Armstrong, American painter
 date unknown
 John Behan, Irish sculptor
Rotraut Klein-Moquay, German-French visual artist
Takeshi Mizukoshi, Japanese landscape photographer

Deaths
 January 1 – Alice Bailly, Swiss painter and multimedia artist (b. 1872)
 January 19 – Rosa Mayreder, Austrian freethinker, author, painter, musician and feminist (b. 1858)
 February 3 – Niels Skovgaard, Danish sculptor and painter (b. 1858)
 February 28 – C. E. Brock, English painter and illustrator (b. 1870)
 April 7 – Suzanne Valadon, French artists' model and painter, mother of Utrillo (b. 1865)
 April 24 – John Wycliffe Lowes Forster, Canadian historical portrait painter (b. 1850)
 May 22 – William Glackens, American realist painter (b. 1870)
 June 15 – Ernst Ludwig Kirchner, German Expressionist painter (b. 1880; suicide)
 June 24 – C. Yarnall Abbott, American photographer and painter (b. 1870)
 September 6 – Mary Seton Watts, British symbolist craftswoman and designer (b. 1849)
 October 24 – Ernst Barlach, German Expressionist sculptor (b. 1870)
 Antonio Fabrés, Catalan painter (b. 1854)

See also
 1938 in fine arts of the Soviet Union

References

 
Years of the 20th century in art
1930s in art